August Yulevich Davidov (December 15, 1823 – December 22, 1885) was a Russian mathematician and engineer, professor at Moscow University, and author of works on differential equations with partial derivatives, definite integrals, and the application of probability theory to statistics, and textbooks on elementary mathematics which were repeatedly reprinted from the 1860s to the 1920s. He was president of the Moscow Mathematical Society from 1866 to 1885.

Early life and education
Davidov was born in Courland where his father was a physician and his younger brother Karl Davidov (1838–1889) became a noted cellist and composer and director of the St. Petersburg Conservatory.

In 1839 Davidov was sent to Moscow to attend the school that is now Bauman Moscow State Technical University. In 1841 Davidov enrolled in the Department of Physics and Mathematics at Moscow University, where he studied under Nikolai Brashman (1796–1866). In 1845 he won a gold medal from the university for his paper "On Infinitesimal Displacements". He was graduated that same year but continued his studies under Brashman. In 1848 he received the title of Master of Mathematics (and later the Demidov Prize from the St. Petersburg Academy of Sciences) for his paper "The Theory of Equilibrium of Bodies Immersed in a Liquid".

Teaching career
Davidov worked briefly as a mathematics teacher in the Cadet Corps, then in 1850 he started as an Associate Lecturer on the theory of probability in the Physics and Mathematics Department of Moscow University. In 1851 he defended his doctoral dissertation "Determination of the Surface of the Fluid Contained in a Vessel" and in the same year published his paper "Theory of Capillary Phenomena".

In 1853 Davidov was appointed Extraordinary Professor in the Department of Applied Mathematics, a position he retained until 1859, when he was appointed Full Professor in the same department. In 1862 Davidov moved to the chair of pure mathematics and remained in that post until the end of his tenure at the university. In 1864 he created a new course on the theory of functions, which he taught until 1869 (after which it was taught by his student Nikolai Bugaev).

Davidov had a great influence on Nikolai Zhukovsky, the "Father of Russian Aviation", who studied at Moscow University (1864–1868) and devoted two essays to analysis of Davidov's work.

Leadership and organizational roles
In 1863 Davidov was elected Dean of the Department of Physics and Mathematics at Moscow University, a post he held until 1873. He was again elected to the position in 1878 and held it until 1880. He served as Vice–President and then President of the Society of Devotees of Natural Science, Anthropology, and Ethnography, was President of the Imperial Russian Society of Acclimatization of Plants and Animals, and was a member of the Natural History Society.

The Moscow Mathematical Society emerged as a scientific circle of mathematics teachers (mostly from the Moscow University), united around a professor of the physics and mathematics faculty of Moscow State University, Nikolai Brashman. The first meeting of the Society was held on September 27, 1864. Brashman was elected first President of the Society and Davidov Vice–President. In 1866, after the death of Brashman, Davidov was elected the second President and remained in the post until his death almost twenty years later.

Pedagogical work

In 1860 Davidov was appointed Inspector of private educational institutions and community activities and became actively engaged in improving the teaching of mathematics at secondary schools. In 1862 he became a member of the Board of Trustees of the Moscow School District, a post he held for the rest of his life. He participated in the design of mathematics curricula under the aegis of the Pedagogical Department of Primary Education of the Polytechnical Museum, and on his initiative the journal Mathematics Anthology added a section for teachers.

Davidov's most lasting contribution to primary and secondary education was his textbooks on mathematics subjects in which he expounded on the mathematical theory in close connection with practical examples, using historical data in examples and incorporating visual aids. These textbooks were well received and went through dozens of reprintings over many decades with little alteration. For instance Upper Secondary School Course on Elementary Geometry went through 39 editions over sixty years and Elementary Algebra 24 editions, the last two under Soviet auspices in 1918 and 1922.

Death
Davidov retired from Moscow University in June 1885 after thirty years of service. That same year, on December 22, he died and was buried in Vvedenskoye Cemetery.

After his death, his widow established a prize in his name, awarded for outstanding work in mathematics. Among the winners of this award were the future academician Nikolai Luzin.

Davidov's son Alexei Davidov (1867–1940) became a cellist and composer, then a successful businessman and industrialist and (after the Russian Revolution) an exile in Germany.

Works
Davidov authored works in mathematics (theory of partial differential equations, theory of definite integrals, application of probability theory to problems of statistics) and mechanics (hydrodynamics, theory of equilibrium of floating bodies, research on links between the theory of capillary phenomena and general equilibrium theory).

Works on mathematics includes:
The application of probability theory to statistics.
The application of probability theory to medicine.

Works on mechanics include:
Design and operation of steam engines.
The greatest number of equilibria of a floating triangular prism.
The theory of equilibrium of bodies immersed in a liquid.

School textbooks include:
Upper Secondary School Course on Elementary Geometry (1863)
Elementary Algebra (1866)
Guide to Arithmetic (1870)
Geometry for the County Schools (1873)
Elementary Trigonometry (1877)
Anthology of Geometric Problems (1888) (Davidov worked on this book at the very end of his life, and it was published after his death.)

Notes

External links
List of articles by Davidov 
Brief biography of Davidov at Academic.ru

References

1823 births
1885 deaths
Scientists from Liepāja
People from Courland Governorate
19th-century mathematicians from the Russian Empire
Mathematicians from the Russian Empire
Moscow State University alumni
Academic staff of Moscow State University
Professorships at the Imperial Moscow University
Imperial Moscow University alumni
Burials at Vvedenskoye Cemetery